The Union Cycliste Internationale (UCI) – the governing body of cycling – categorizes teams into three divisions. The first division, consisting of the top 19 teams, are classified as UCI WorldTeams, and compete in the UCI World Tour. The second and third divisions respectively are the ProTeams (formerly Professional Continental teams) and the Continental teams.

2020 UCI ProTeams 
According to the UCI Rulebook,

"A ProTeam is an organisation created to take part in road events open to ProTeams. It is known by a unique name and registered with the UCI in accordance with the provisions below.
 The ProTeam comprises all the riders registered with the UCI as members of the team. This includes the paying agent, the sponsors and all other persons contracted by the paying agent and/or the sponsors to provide for the continuing operation of the team (manager, team manager, coach, paramedical assistant, mechanic, etc.).
 Each ProTeam must employ at least 20 riders, 3 team managers and 5 other staff (paramedical assistants, mechanics, etc.) on a full time basis to be eligible for the whole registration year."

ProTeams compete in the UCI Continental Circuits, which is divided into five continental zones: Africa, America, Asia, Europe and Oceania. Sometimes, teams are also invited to participate in UCI World Tour and UCI ProSeries events, usually through wildcard invitations, although they are not eligible to win points in the World Tour rankings.

2020 UCI Continental teams 
Continental teams, the third division of the UCI cycling pyramid, compete almost exclusively in the UCI Continental Circuits while sometimes getting wildcard invitations to UCI ProSeries events as well.

References

2020
2020 in men's road cycling